Nebojša Joksimović (Serbian Cyrillic: Небојша Јоксимовић; born April 1, 1981) is a Serbian former footballer who played as a defender.

Honours
Serbian SuperLiga (2):  2005–06, 2006-07
Serbian Cup (2):  2005–06, 2006-07

External links
 Profile at Srbijafudbal
 Video at Mefeedia

1981 births
Living people
Sportspeople from Čačak
Serbian footballers
FK Kolubara players
FK Radnički Beograd players
FK Radnički Obrenovac players
FK Vojvodina players
Red Star Belgrade footballers
Swiss Super League players
Neuchâtel Xamax FCS players
FK Čukarički players
Serbian SuperLiga players
Association football central defenders